The 2020–21 Big Easy Tour was the 10th season of the Big Easy Tour, and the third in which events received Official World Golf Ranking points.

Schedule
The following table lists official events during the 2020–21 season.

Order of Merit
The Order of Merit was based on prize money won during the season, calculated in South African rand. The top 10 players on the tour earned status to play on the 2022–23 Sunshine Tour.

Notes

References

2020 in golf
2021 in golf
2020 in South African sport
2021 in South African sport